The Alliance of Southern Forces was a Syrian rebel coalition consisting of 8 rebel factions from the Free Syrian Army's Southern Front. The group operated in southwestern Syria. The coalition supported the High Negotiations Committee and its participation in the Geneva peace talks on Syria.

Member groups

Omari Brigades
18 March Division
Martyr Houran
Liberation of Houran
Engineering and Rocket Battalion
Division of Decisiveness
Houran Column Division
Subject of Islam Brigade
Martyrs of Freedom Division
Division of Righteousness
46th Infantry Division
24th Infantry Division
69th Special Forces Division
Free Men of Inkhil Brigade
Murabitun Brigade
Lions of Islam Brigade
Fath al-Mubin Brigade
Al-Bayt Brigade
1st Special Tasks Brigade
Salvation Army
Free Nawa Division
8th Infantry Division
Martyr Jamil Abu Zain Sharaf Division
Special Task Force Division
Brigade of Dignity

History
On 19 May 2017, Mazen Jawad, also known by his nom de guerre Abu Walid, a commander of the Free Nawa Division of the Alliance of Southern Forces, was assassinated by unknown assailants at his home in Inkhil.

See also
First Army (Syrian rebel group)
Hawks of the South

References

Anti-government factions of the Syrian civil war
Anti-ISIL factions in Syria
Free Syrian Army